Illex oxygonius, commonly known as the sharptail shortfin squid, is a species of neritic squids in the family Ommastrephidae. Of the species of the genus Illex, they have the most restricted range, being found only in the western North Atlantic Ocean; from off New Jersey, south to the Straits of Florida and into the Gulf of Mexico. They are very difficult to distinguish from Illex coindetii and Illex illecebrosus, with which their geographic range overlaps. The most obvious difference of I. oxygnius is their sharper fin angles of 25° to 40° (hence their common name). There is also the possibility that they may be a hybrid of I. coindetii and I. illecebrosus.

References

Squid
Molluscs of the Atlantic Ocean
Fauna of the Caribbean
Marine molluscs of North America
Molluscs of the United States
Cephalopods of North America
Molluscs described in 1969